Taylorville Senior High School is a four-year public high school located in Taylorville, Illinois. The mascot is Tommy Tornado. The school colors are purple and gold.

THS is part of TCUSD #3 which also includes a middle-school, three elementary schools located in Taylorville and Mt. Auburn Elementary School and Stonington Elementary. However, at the end of the 2008–2009 academic school year, West Elementary School and Mt. Auburn closed.

Publications
The THS journalism class publishes a monthly-newspaper and annual yearbook, the Zephyr and Drift, respectively. As of the 2011–2012 school year, the Zephyr is also available through a full-color online PDF version.

Notable alumni
 Ron Bontemps, Captain of the 1952 U.S. men's basketball team, which won the gold medal.
 Jon Corzine, former governor of New Jersey
 Vern Mullen, professional football player (Canton Bulldogs, Chicago Bears, Chicago Cardinals, and Pottsville Maroons)
 Johnny Orr, former UMass, Michigan, and Iowa State head basketball coach
 Pat Perry, former Major League Baseball player (St. Louis Cardinals, Cincinnati Reds, Chicago Cubs, Los Angeles Dodgers)
 Bill Ridley, All-American basketball player at the University of Illinois

Notable staff
 Dolph Stanley, Hall of fame coach that guided the 1944 Tornadoes to the first undefeated state championship in the history of Illinois.  Stanley is best known for holding the "unbreakable" record of guiding five different Illinois High School Association (IHSA) schools into the state tournament.

References

Public high schools in Illinois
Schools in Christian County, Illinois